Musa ibn Yahya was a member of the powerful Barmakid family in the service of the Abbasid Caliphate.

Life
Musa was a son of Yahya ibn Khalid. He was not as prominent as his brothers Ja'far and al-Fadl, but was well known for his bravery in battle. He served as governor of Syria in 792, to suppress the Qays–Yaman conflict in the province. In 802, he was denounced to Caliph Harun al-Rashid by the governor of Khurasan, Ali ibn Isa ibn Mahan, as planning to raise the province in revolt against the Caliph. According to a report relayed by al-Tabari, at the same time Musa had to go into hiding from his debtors, so the Caliph became suspicious that he was about to secretly go to Khurasan; when Musa appeared before the Caliph, he had him arrested, and released only after his father vouchsafed for him.

When the Barmakids were deposed and arrested by Caliph Harun al-Rashid in 803, Musa too was imprisoned with his father and brothers until the accession of al-Amin, who released them and showed them again some favour. During the Fourth Fitna, Musa sided with al-Amin, fighting in the ranks of the loyalist army against al-Ma'mun, but he later entered the latter's service. Al-Ma'mun appointed him as governor of Sindh. Musa died in office in 835, and was succeeded by his son, Imran.

A grandson of Musa, Ahmad ibn Ja'far, surnamed Jahza, was one of the closest companions of the Caliph al-Muqtadir.

Family tree

References

Sources
 
 
 

8th-century births
835 deaths
8th-century Iranian people
8th-century people from the Abbasid Caliphate
9th-century Iranian people
9th-century people from the Abbasid Caliphate
Abbasid governors of Damascus
Abbasid governors of Sind
Barmakids
Prisoners and detainees of the Abbasid Caliphate